Stenoterommata uruguai is a mygalomorph spider of Argentina, named after its type locality: Salto del Uruguaí. This species is distinguished from other Stenoterommata (having anterior tarsi with reduced inferior tarsal claws) by its spermathecae consisting of a single dome bearing numerous receptacula. Its spermathecae are similar to those of S. quena, but in S. uruguai the basal dome is more rounded.

Description
Female: total length ; cephalothorax length , width ; cephalic region length , width ; fovea width ; labium length , width ; sternum length , width . Its cephalic region is convex with its fovea procurved. Its Labium has no cuspules and serrula are absent. Their sternal sigilla is very shallow and in most specimens (not always) smaller and more widely separated from the margin than in other species of the genus (particularly the sympatric  S. iguazu. Chelicerae: rastellum weak, only thin, attenuate setae; cephalothorax, legs and palpi are reddish brown, with golden hairs; abdomen yellowish brown, with darker mottles.

Distribution
Misiones Province, Argentina.

See also
Spider anatomy
Iguazú National Park

References

External links

ADW entry

Pycnothelidae
Spiders of Argentina
Spiders described in 1995